Casque was one of a dozen s built for the French Navy in the first decade of the 20th century. She was sold for scrap in 1927.

Design and description
The Bouclier class were designed to a general specification and varied significantly from each other in various ways. Designed to displace , Casque displaced  at normal load. Their crew numbered 80–83 men.

Casque was powered by three Parsons direct-drive steam turbines, each driving one propeller shaft, using steam provided by four water-tube boilers. Casque handily exceed that speed, reaching  during her sea trials.

The primary armament of the Bouclier-class ships consisted of two  Modèle 1893 guns in single mounts, one each fore and aft of the superstructure, and four  Modèle 1902 guns distributed amidships. They were also fitted with two twin mounts for  torpedo tubes amidships.

Construction and career

Casque was ordered from Forges et Chantiers de la Méditerranée and was launched from its La Seyne-sur-Mer shipyard on 25 August 1910. The ship was completed in 1911.

References

Bibliography

 

Bouclier-class destroyers
Ships built in France
1910 ships